"Machine Gun Blues" is a song by Social Distortion. It was the first single from their seventh studio album, Hard Times and Nursery Rhymes (2011). The song was featured on Season 4, Episode 7 of Sons of Anarchy. The song was also used by WWE to promote a feud between The Miz and Randy Orton at the 2011 WWE Royal Rumble.

Background
The single was made available for download on November 16, 2010.

Charts

References

Social Distortion songs
2010 singles
2010 songs
Songs written by Mike Ness
Epitaph Records singles